Tympanocryptis diabolicus, the Hamersley pebble-mimic dragon, is a species of agama found in Western Australia.

References

diabolicus
Agamid lizards of Australia
Taxa named by Paul Doughty
Taxa named by Luke Kealley
Taxa named by Jane Melville
Reptiles described in 2015